The 2019 Budapest Assembly election was held on 13 October 2019, concurring with other local elections in Hungary. Voters elected the Mayor of Budapest, and the mayors of the 23 districts directly, while 9 seats in the assembly were distributed proportionally, taking into account votes cast for losing district mayoral candidates.

Mayor 

Gergely Karácsony was elected mayor with 50.86% of the vote, defeating incumbent István Tarlós who held the office since 2010.

District mayors 
The opposition won the majority of district mayoral races.

 Italics denote a mayor not running for reelection

In case of joint candidates, bold denotes the party to which the candidate personally belongs.
In the 23 districts, 14 opposition or opposition supported candidates won, with 9 government-aligned or government-supported mayors. This is a sharp improvement for the opposition as they previously only occupied 4 of these mayorships.

In most of the cities, the assembly majority is composed of members aligned with the mayor, except:
 X., with a Fidesz-KDNP mayor, and no clear majority
 XX., with an independent (Fidesz-KDNP supported) mayor, and opposition majority
 XXI., with a Fidesz-KDNP mayor, and no clear majority
 XXII., with a Fidesz-KDNP mayor, and opposition majority
In XXIII., the mayor's civil organization together with Fidesz-KDNP members have a majority.

Party list seats 

Candidates elected on the Fidesz–KDNP list:
 István Tarlós (1.) – did not take his seat
 Gábor Bagdy (2.)
 Zsolt Láng (4.)
 Zsófia Hassay (5.)
 Zsolt Wintermantel (8.) – did not take his seat
 Gábor Tamás Nagy (14.)

Candidates elected on the Momentum–DK–MSZP–Dialogue–LMP list:
 Kata Tüttő (2., MSZP)
 Erzsébet Gy. Németh (3., DK)
 Gábor Havasi (4., Momentum)

Number in parentheses is the candidate's original position on the list, as some list candidates were elected to a mayorship.

Tarlós announced on 15 October 2019, that he won't take his seat. This caused Attila Ughy (list position 15) to take his seat instead. Zsolt Wintermantel did not take either his seat on 28 October; he was replaced by Gábor Pintér, according to the request of the Fidesz–KDNP alliance. Botond Sára (9.) and Tamás Hoffmann (11.) were elected into the local representative bodies in their districts, therefore they were excluded from the party compensation list.

Breakdown of seats 
The opposition won a majority in the Assembly, breaking over 15 years of a Fidesz majority.

Detailed results 

Italics means incumbent, bold means winner of the election.

Notes

References 

2019 in Hungary
Budapest
Local elections in Hungary
History of Budapest